Metro Park is an Indian sitcom web television series on Eros Now about the  Indian Gujarati family living in Metro Park, an Indian-American majority neighborhood in Middlesex County, New Jersey, United States, and the funny problems they face.

Cast 
 Ranvir Shorey as Kalpesh Patel
 Purbi Joshi as Payal Patel
 Omi Vaidya as Kannan Menon 
 Vega Tamotia as Kinjal Patel, Kannan's wife and Payal's sister
 Pitobash Tripathy as Bittu Amritraj , Kalpesh's store assistant
 Arnav Joshi as Pankaj Patel, Kalpesh and Payal's son
 Aashmi Joshi as Simran (Munni) Patel, Kalpesh & Payal's daughter
 Sarita Joshi as Mummy, Payal & Kinjal's Mother, Kalpesh & Kannan's mother-in-law - Season 2
 Milind Soman as Arpit, a dentist, Payal's schoolmate and first crush (cameo) - Season 2
 Gopal Dutt as Dr. Vivek Saini, a therapist (cameo) - Season 2

Episodes

Season 1

Quarantine Edition

Season 2

Production 
Metro Park is a "revamped" version of Akkara Kazhchakal, a Malayali sitcom aired in 2008–10.

Release 
To celebrate the launch of the series, Prem Parameswaran (President of North America Eros), Abi Varghese, Ajayan Venugopalan and Omi Vaidya rang the Opening Bell at the New York Stock Exchange on Friday, 1 March.  A special "Quarantine Edition" was released in 2020, and Season 2 was released on 29 January 2021.

Reception 
The show was nominated in all major categories for the CNN-IBN Ireel awards 2019 including Best Comedy, Best Actor Comedy, Best Actress Comedy. Ranvir Shorey won Gold awards Best Actor(Comedy) for his portrayal of Kalpesh Patel in Metropark.

Hindustan Times found the special "Quarantine Edition" released in 2020 to be hilarious.

Season 2 was called light-hearted but determinedly middling by The Indian Express, also receiving an average review of 3/5 stars from The Times of India

See also
 Akkara Kazhchakal

References

External links 
 
 Eros Now Wins Awards at SCREENXX 2020 Awards
 Ranvir Shorey starrer Metro Park to return with Season 2
 'Metro Park' renewed for Season 2

Indian comedy television series